This table displays the top-rated primetime television series of the 1982–83 season as measured by Nielsen Media Research.

See also 
Season ratings (newspapers.com: fully lists the top 98 shows for the season, though without ratings points)

References

1982 in American television
1983 in American television
1982-related lists
1983-related lists
Lists of American television series